"Sunburn" is a song by English rock band Muse, released as the fourth single from their 1999 debut album Showbiz.

Release 
"Sunburn" was released on 21 February 2000 on 7" vinyl—backed with a live acoustic version of the song—and double CD—backed with "Ashamed", a live version of the song, "Yes Please" and a live version of "Uno". It reached number 22 in the UK Singles Chart, making it their first song to enter the Top 40.

Music video

The music video for "Sunburn", directed by Nick Gordon, depicts a young Brooke Kinsella—who later rose to fame as an actress on EastEnders—babysitting a young boy (Liam Hess) until she heads upstairs to investigate something. Entering a bedroom, she enters a wardrobe for a few minutes and begins to steal jewellery before Matthew Bellamy and Christopher Wolstenholme appear playing in the mirrors on the doors either side of her. Before she can see them, they quickly disappear in reality. Standing in front of a giant mirror, she's shocked when Bellamy, Wolstenholme and Dominic Howard emerge, playing only as their reflections. The young woman struggles to cope with seeing them perform in the mirror, clasping her head in frustration and throws an object at the mirror, smashing it. The young boy enters, he sees the room in a mess and then looks behind him. In the mirror, Muse have strangely vanished, and in their place is the girl. The video ends in a still of the boy staring in disbelief at the empty sofa, while in the mirror the girl is sitting on it.

Live performances 
"Sunburn" was one of Muse's most performed songs live, and was a permanent fixture in the band's concerts from 1999 to 2004. While not a staple, "Sunburn" was performed often on the Black Holes and Revelations Tour, and made occasional appearances on The Resistance Tour, The 2nd Law Tour, and Drones World Tour. The song has not been performed since 2016.

Track listing

Release history

Charts

References

External links
 

Muse (band) songs
2000 singles
Songs written by Matt Bellamy
1999 songs
Mushroom Records singles